Mariliana is a genus of longhorn beetles of the subfamily Lamiinae, containing the following species:

 Mariliana amazonica Galileo & Martins, 2004
 Mariliana cicadellida Galileo & Martins, 2004
 Mariliana hovorei Galileo & Martins, 2005
 Mariliana niveopicta Lane, 1970
 Mariliana ocularis (Hope, 1846)
 Mariliana rupicola Lane, 1970
 Mariliana sumpta Lane, 1970

References

Hemilophini